Taras Hryhorovych Shevchenko ( – ) was a Ukrainian poet, writer, artist, public and political figure, as well as folklorist and ethnographer. His literary heritage is regarded to be the foundation of modern Ukrainian literature and, to a large extent, the modern Ukrainian language. Shevchenko is also known for many masterpieces as a painter and an illustrator.

Places and objects commemorating Shevchenko

In March 2014, by the 200th birth anniversary of the poet the first interactive map of sites dedicated to Taras Shevchenko was created.

On the interactive map "The World of Shevchenko" created by the Inter (TV channel) and information portal Podrobnosti, 1060 monuments of Kobzar, towns, villages, museums, schools, theaters named in his honor have been defined. These objects are located in 32 countries on different continents. The interactive map allows users to view monuments with a help of sight-seeing service.

Among the most notable objects commemorating Shevchenko are the symbolic kobza sculpture in Canberra, Australia's capital, graffiti of poet's portrait in Kharkiv and the memorial in Washington. The most distant objects dedicated to the poet are the monument in Beijing (distance from Kyiv is 6456 km), Shevchenko street in Khabarovsk (6900 km), memorial in Washington (7847 km), Buenos Aires (12 826 km) and Canberra (14 913 km).

From 1966 to 1968 Hanna Veres made a series of ornamental textiles, dedicated to Taras Shevchenko. The 1971 edition of Shevchenko's Kobzar is illustrated with reproductions of them, co-produced with Anna Vasylashchuk.

Geographic places
Taras Shevchenko has been commemorated by the naming of geographic places including:

 Fort-Shevchenko, a military-base town and administrative center in Kazakhstan
 Korsun-Shevchenkivskyi, a city in central Ukraine
 Shevchenko Raion, a district in Kyiv
 Taras Shevchenko Place, a street in New York City
 Taras Shevchenko ko'chasi, a street in Tashkent, Uzbekistan. This street also hosts Taras Shevchenko monument
 Shevchenko Boulevard, a street in LaSalle, Quebec
 Station Tarasa Shevchenka, a station in the Kyiv Metro

Educational institutions
 Taras Shevchenko National University of Kyiv, the third oldest university in Ukraine
 School 110, Tashkent, Uzbekistan is named after Taras Shevchenko
 Shevchenko Transnistria State University in Tiraspol, the capital of Transnistria, the region's main university.
 National Museum Taras Shevchenko, museum in Kyiv

Other
 Shevchenko National Prize, a Ukrainian State Prize for works of culture and arts  
 2427 Kobzar – an asteroid
 Interbrigade company Taras Shevchenko, a Ukrainian volunteer formation in the Spanish Civil War.

Memorials

Ukraine

There are many monuments to Shevchenko throughout Ukraine, most notably at his memorial in Kaniv and in the center of Kyiv, just across from the Kyiv University that bears his name. The Kyiv Metro station, Tarasa Shevchenka, is also dedicated to Shevchenko. Among other notable monuments to the poet located throughout Ukraine are the ones in Kharkiv (in front of the Shevchenko Park), Lviv, Luhansk and many others.

After Ukraine gained its independence in the wake of the 1991 Soviet Collapse, some Ukrainian cities replaced their statues of Lenin with statues of Taras Shevchenko and in some locations that lacked streets named to him, local authorities renamed the streets or squares to Shevchenko.

In 2001, the Ukrainian society "Prosvita" raised the initiative of building a Church near the Chernecha Mount in Kaniv, where Taras Shevchenko is buried. The initiative got a rather supportive response in the society. Since then many charity events have been held all over the country to gather donations for the above purpose. A marathon under the slogan "Let's Build a Church for the Kobzar" by the First National Radio Channel of Ukraine collected ₴39,000 (about US$7,500) in October 2003.

Former USSR countries

Outside of Ukraine, monuments to Shevchenko have been put up in several locations of the former USSR associated with his legacy, both in the Soviet and the post-Soviet times. The modern monument in Saint Petersburg was erected on December 22, 2000, but the first monument (pictured) was built in the city in 1918 on the order of Lenin shortly after the October Revolution. There is also a monument located next to the Shevchenko museum at the square that bears the poet's name in Orsk, Russia (the location of the military garrison where the poet served) where there are also a street, a library and the Pedagogical Institute named to the poet. There are Shevchenko monuments and museums in the cities of Kazakhstan where he was later transferred by the military: Aqtau (the city was named Shevchenko between 1964 and 1992) and nearby Fort Shevchenko (renamed from Fort Alexandrovsky in 1939), and a street after him in Vilnius, where he also lived. T.G. Shevchenko University in Tiraspol, the capital of Transnistria, is the main university of that region.
There is also a bilingual Taras Shevchenko high school in Sighetu Marmatiei, Romania. A monument to Taras Shevchenko on a street that bears his name can also be found in the city centre of Tashkent, Uzbekistan. A boulevard named after Shevchenko appeared in Minsk, Belarus in 1964, and a small monument to Shevchenko at the beginning of the boulevard in 1978. In 2002 another monument to Taras Shevchenko was inaugurated in Minsk (at the Stepanovski garden).

North America
Outside of Ukraine and the former USSR, monuments to Shevchenko have been put up in many countries, usually under the initiative of local Ukrainian diasporas. There are several memorial societies and monuments to him throughout Canada and the United States. 
The most notable American monument is the large bronze and granite monument in Washington, D.C., near Dupont Circle designed by artist Leo Mol. The carving of the granite stonework was by Vincent Illuzzi of Barre, Vermont. There is also a monument in Soyuzivka in New York State, Tipperary Hill in Syracuse, New York.

A park in Elmira Heights, N.Y. has a memorial to Shevchenko and to the Ukrainian diaspora. A street is named after Shevchenko in New York City's East Village. A section of Connecticut Route 9 that goes through New Britain is also named after Shevchenko.

The most notable Canadian monument is the bronze and granite statue of Taras Shevchenko in Ottawa, created by Leo Mol, and unveiled on June 26, 2011. (see Taras Shevchenko Monument Ottawa).
The Leo Mol sculpture garden in Winnipeg, Manitoba, Canada, contains many images of Taras Shevchenko.

A two-tonne bronze statue of Shevchenko, located in a memorial park outside of Oakville, Ontario was discovered stolen in December 2006. It was taken for scrap metal; the head was recovered in a damaged state, but the statue was not repairable. The head is on exhibit at the Taras Shevchenko Museum & Memorial Park Foundation in Toronto.

A Taras Shevchenko Museum & Memorial Park Foundation is located in Toronto, Ontario, Canada. A video tour of the museum was created in March 2010. Among other exhibits, the video tour includes footage of Shevchenko's death mask.

There is a Shevchenko Boulevard in the Lasalle borough of Montreal, Quebec. The town of Vita in Manitoba, Canada was originally named Shevchenko in his honor.

Elsewhere
There is a statue and monument in Palermo Park in Buenos Aires, Argentina 

There is a statue of Taras Shevchenko at Ukraine Square in Curitiba, Brazil.

There are three busts in Greece: a) in the yard of the Ukrainian embassy in Filothei, Athens, b) in the Goudi Park in Zografou, Athens, and c) in the Taras Hryhorovych Shevchenko Square in Mandra, a small city 26 km west of Athens.

There is a Shevchenko Square in Paris located in the heart of the central Saint-Germain-des-Prés district.

The British band New Order released a live video on Factory Records titled Taras Shevchenko, recorded in 1981 at the Ukrainian National Home in the East Village of New York City; the initial scenes feature a digitised version of the Shevchenko self-portrait. The video artwork was done by graphic designer Peter Saville. This was later included on their video New Order 3 16.

Currency

Postage

See also
 Taras Shevchenko

References

Monuments and memorials to Taras Shevchenko
Shevchenko
Taras Shevchenko